This is the complete episode listing for the Canadian CGI television series ReBoot, which was broadcast on YTV, as well as in the United States on ABC and Cartoon Network's Toonami block between 1994 and 2001.

A total of 47 episodes have been produced, including two television films which were syndicated as the eight-episode fourth season in 2001. An un-aired "making of" special, set within the first two seasons, has also been produced.

Series overview

Season 1 (1994–1995)

Season 2 (1995–1996)

Season 3 (1997–1998)

Season 4 (2001) 
In its DVD release and original Canadian broadcast, the fourth season was initially presented as two films, and was then syndicated as separate episodes.

Daemon Rising

My Two Bobs

Special

External links 
 tv.com episode listings (archived)
 TV Guide
 The unofficial ReBoot home page

ReBoot
Episodes